The Roman Catholic Diocese of Bragança do Pará is a diocese located in the city of Bragança do Pará in the Ecclesiastical province of Belém do Pará in Brazil.

History
 April 14, 1928: Established as Territorial Prelature of Gurupi from the Metropolitan Archdiocese of Belém do Pará
 February 3, 1934: Renamed as Territorial Prelature of Guamá
 October 16, 1979: Promoted as Diocese of Guamá
 October 13, 1981: Renamed as Diocese of Bragança do Pará

Bishops
 Prelates of Guamá (Latin Rite)
 Eliseu Maria Coroli, B. (1940.08.10 – 1977.02.05)
 Bishops of Guamá (Latin Rite)
 Miguel Maria Giambelli, B. (1980.04.21 – 1981.10.13)
 Bishops of Bragança do Pará (Latin Rite)
 Miguel Maria Giambelli, B. (1981.10.13 – 1996.04.10)
 Luigi Ferrando (1996.04.10 – 2016.08.17)
 Jesús María Cizaurre Berdonces, O.A.R. (2016.08.17 - )

Other priest of this diocese who became bishop
Manoel de Oliveira Soares Filho, appointed Bishop of Palmeira dos Índios, Alagoas in 2018

Sources
 GCatholic.org
 Catholic Hierarchy

Roman Catholic dioceses in Brazil
Christian organizations established in 1928
Braganca do Para, Roman Catholic Diocese of
Roman Catholic dioceses and prelatures established in the 20th century